"98.6" is a song written by Tony Powers (lyrics) and George Fischoff (music) and recorded by Keith.  It reached No. 7 on the Billboard chart and No. 24 on the UK Singles Chart in 1967  and appeared on his 1967 album 98.6/Ain't Gonna Lie.  The Tokens, who had provided the backing vocals on Keith's debut single, "Ain't Gonna Lie", did the same for "98.6".

Produced by Jerry Ross and arranged by Joe Renzetti, it sold over one million copies worldwide, earning a gold disc.

Subsequent recordings 
The Bystanders released a version in January 1967. It reached No. 45 on the UK Singles Chart and was featured in the 2009 movie, The Boat That Rocked.
Lesley Gore released a medley including this song and another by Powers and Fischoff, "Lazy Day", in May 1969.  The medley went to No. 36 on the U.S. adult contemporary chart.

See also
 List of 1960s one-hit wonders in the United States

References

1966 songs
1966 singles
1967 singles
1969 singles
Songs written by Tony Powers
Lesley Gore songs
Mercury Records singles
Songs written by George Fischoff